Surma ratsanikud ( or ) is a novel by Estonian author Karl Ristikivi. It was first published in 1963 in Lund, Sweden by Eesti Kirjanike Kooperatiiv (Estonian Writers' Cooperative). In Estonia, it was published in 1990.

The novel presents a fictionalised account of the adventures of Roger de Flor's mercenary Catalan Company in 14th-century Byzantium and elsewhere, as told by the fictional protagonist Pedro Casarmana.

See also
 Tirant lo Blanch

1963 novels
Novels by Karl Ristikivi